Cambodia participated in the 2014 Asian Games in Incheon, South Korea from 19 September to 4 October 2014. The country won its first-ever Asian Games gold medal courtesy of Sorn Seavmey in women's taekwondo middleweight class. Seavmey also was her country's only medalist in the competition.

Medal summary

Cambodia won its first-ever Asian Games gold medal after 44 years of await. Taekwondo practitioner Sorn Seavmey, then  aged 19, won the title competing in Taekwondo for Women’s under 73 kg.

Athletics (track and field)

Men
Track & road events

References

Asian Games
2014
Nations at the 2014 Asian Games